McLaglen is a surname. Notable people with the surname include:

Andrew McLaglen (1920–2014), American film director and actor
Clifford McLaglen (1892–1978), British actor
Cyril McLaglen (1899–1987), English actor
Victor McLaglen (1886–1959), English boxer, World War I officer and actor